Jerry Lionel Ainsworth (11 September 1877 – 30 December 1923) was a first-class cricketer.  He was born in Freshfield, Formby, Lancashire and died in Falmouth, Cornwall.

A slow left-arm bowler, he took 50 first-class wickets at just 15.82. He played 4 matches for Lancashire County Cricket Club in 1899 and also appeared for PF Warner's XI in 1898, AJ Webbe's XI in 1900, HDG Leveson-Gower's XI in 1902 and the Europeans in India in 1904/05.

His brother, George Ainsworth was also a first-class cricketer. Ainsworth was no batsman but took 5 wickets in an innings 5 times, 4 of these against the Philadelphians, against whom he claimed his best figures of 7 for 61.

References

1877 births
1923 deaths
English cricketers
Lancashire cricketers
People from Formby
Europeans cricketers
H. D. G. Leveson Gower's XI cricketers
P. F. Warner's XI cricketers
A. J. Webbe's XI cricketers